Urban Knights VI is the sixth album of the jazz group Urban Knights, released in 2005 by Narada Records. The album rose to No. 7 on the Billboard Jazz Albums chart.

Overview
Urban Knights VI was executively produced by Ramsey Lewis.

Covers
The album features cover versions of two tracks:

• School Days by Stanley Clarke.

• My Boo by Usher and Alicia Keys.

Tracklisting

References

2005 albums
Urban Knights albums